Harold Fletcher Grant (July 10, 1877 – October 8, 1915) was an American auto racing driver.

Biography
He was born in Cambridge, Massachusetts, on July 10, 1877. His father was a mining engineer who was killed in a mining accident in Colorado.

Driving an American Locomotive Company automobile, Grant won the Vanderbilt Cup on Long Island Motor Parkway in 1909 and 1910. He then competed in the Indianapolis 500 four times between 1911 and 1915. He had his best showing in 1914, finishing in 7th place.

On October 8, 1915, Grant was killed at Sheepshead Bay, Brooklyn when his car crashed during a practice run for the Astor Cup.

Indianapolis 500 results

References

External links 

 

1877 births
1915 deaths
Burials in Massachusetts
Indianapolis 500 drivers
Sportspeople from Cambridge, Massachusetts
Racing drivers from Boston
Racing drivers from Massachusetts
Racing drivers who died while racing
Sports deaths in New York (state)